Zhang Junfang  may refer to:

 Zhang Junfang (poet), Tang dynasty poet
 Zhang Junfang (writer), Northern Song dynasty writer